The Archdiocese of Bamberg (lat. Archidioecesis Bambergensis) is a diocese of the Roman Catholic Church in Bavaria and is one of 27 Roman Catholic dioceses in Germany. In 2015, 32.9% of the population identified as Catholic, and 15.6% of those reported that they attend Mass on Sunday; a relatively high number in Germany. The archdiocese comprises the majority of the administrative regions of Upper Franconia and Middle Franconia, as well as a small part of Lower Franconia and the Upper Palatinate. Its seat is Bamberg. The dioceses of Speyer, Eichstätt, and Würzburg are subordinate to it. The Diocese was founded in 1007 out of parts of the dioceses of Eichstätt and Würzburg.  In 1817, the diocese was raised to an archdiocese.

History 

On 1 November 1007, a synod was held in Frankfurt. Eight archbishops and twenty-seven bishops were present at the synod as well as the German King Henry II. Henry II intended to create a new diocese that would aid in the final conquest of paganism in the area around Bamberg. But the territory of the Wends on the upper Main, the Wiesent, and the Aisch had belonged to the Diocese of Würzburg since the organization of the Middle German bishoprics by St. Boniface, so that no new diocese could be erected without the consent of the occupant of that see. The bishop of Würzburg raised no objection to parting with some of his territory, especially as the king promised to have Würzburg raised to an archbishopric and to give him an equivalent in Meiningen. The consent of Pope John XVII was obtained for this arrangement, but the elevation of Würzburg to an archbishopric proved impracticable, and its bishop withdrew his consent. 

At the synod, Henry obtained permission for the foundation of the diocese of Bamberg from parts of the dioceses of Würzburg and Eichstätt. Bamberg was made directly subordinate to Rome. It was also decided that Eberhard, the king's chancellor, would be ordained by the archbishop of Mainz, Willigis, to be the head of the new border area diocese. The new diocese had expensive gifts at the synod confirmed by documents, in order to place it on a solid foundation. Henry wanted the celebrated monkish rigour and studiousness of the Hildesheim cathedral chapter – Henry himself was educated there – linked together with the churches under his control, including his favourite diocese of Bamberg. The next seven bishops were named by the emperors, after which free canonical election was the rule. Eberhard's immediate successor, Suidger of Morsleben, became pope in 1046 as Clement II. He was the only pope to be interred north of the Alps in the Bamberg Cathedral. In the thirteenth century, the diocese gradually became a territorial principality, and its bishops took secular precedence next after the archbishops; Bishop Henry I was the first prince-bishop.

The fortieth bishop, George III of Limburg (1505–22), was inclined toward the Reformation, which caused a violent social outbreak under his successor Weigand (1522–56), and the city suffered severely in the Second Margrave War (1552–55), as well as in the Thirty Years' War, when it was placed under the jurisdiction of Bernard, the new Duke of Franconia.

At the Peace of Westphalia (1648), the bishops recovered their possessions. In 1802, in the course of the German mediatization, the prince-bishopric was secularized and its territory annexed to Bavaria. From 1808 to 1817 the diocese was vacant; but by the Bavarian Concordat of the latter year it was made an archbishopric, with Würzburg, Speyer, and Eichstädt as suffragan sees.

Archbishops

See also
 Prince-Bishopric of Bamberg

References

External links
 
 Official German Catholic Church Statistics website
 Official site

Roman Catholic dioceses in Germany
1007 establishments in Europe
 
Roman Catholic dioceses established in the 11th century
Bamberg Cathedral
Roman Catholic ecclesiastical provinces in Germany